Jerzy Koryciak (born 7 March 1954) is a Polish cross-country skier. He competed in the men's 30 kilometre event at the 1976 Winter Olympics.

References

External links
 

1954 births
Living people
Polish male cross-country skiers
Olympic cross-country skiers of Poland
Cross-country skiers at the 1976 Winter Olympics
People from Żywiec County